Saint-Martin-des-Noyers is a commune in the Vendée department in the Pays de la Loire region in western France.

Geography
The river Yon has its source in the commune and forms part of its southern border.

See also
Communes of the Vendée department

References

Communes of Vendée